The 501st Celebrated Mountain Brigade was formed on July 19, 1992, as the First Bihać Infantry Brigade in Kamenica near Bihać, with the aim of defending Bihać and its surroundings from Serbian attacks. Although the brigade had no problems with the number of men, the main problem of this brigade and the entire Army of the Republic of Bosnia and Herzegovina was the lack of weapons and military equipment, despite its contribution during the War in Bosnia and Herzegovina was extremely significant and large.

Order Of Battle 
The 501st Celebrated Mountain Brigade was formed on July 19, 1992, at the very beginning of the attack by Serbian paramilitary formations on the besieged Bihać district, which gained its true shape and intensity in the following days. The brigade was composed of young volunteers from the Bihać municipality and new refugees from the surrounding occupied territory. When forming the brigade, it consisted of:

 1st Detachment TO Ljutoč
 2nd Detachment TO Center
 3rd detachment TO Bakšajš
 mortar platoon from the Municipal Headquarters TO Bihać
 part of the reconnaissance platoon from the Municipal Headquarters of the Bihać TO
On the day of the formation, there were 85 officiers, 125 non-commissioned officers and 1131 fighters

Warpath 
The brigade was formed shortly after the first attacks on the city of Bihać, and the first combat tasks were to defend the first line of defense around Bihać. During the first half of the war, the brigade did not have significant offensive actions, the main actions were of a defensive nature with the aim of preventing the city from falling into the hands of the aggressors. Significant operations in which the brigade gave its contribution were the liberation of Grabež, Ripče, and other settlements in Operation Grabež 94, followed by operations: Winter 94, Morning, Spider, Ripač 95, Sana 95.

Losses 
The Brigade had 307 dead, 1763 wounded, 69 missing or captured and 518 injured or a total of 2657 fighters and elders. 29 fighters and elders are "Zlatni Ljiljani"

Command 

 Commander: Senad Sarganović
 Chief of Staff: Izet Pajić
 Assistant for morale, IPD and VP: Senudin Jašarević 
 Security Assistant: Kasim Ćurtović 
 Assistant for logistics: Ekrem Šiljdedić 
 Assistant for filling and personal affairs: Nedib Hodžić

References

Notes

Bibliography 

 
 

Military units and formations of the Army of the Republic of Bosnia and Herzegovina
Bosniak history
Military units and formations established in 1992